Steve Bryant may refer to:
 Steve Bryant (American football) (born 1959), former American football player
 Steve Bryant (English footballer) (born 1953), English former footballer
 Steven Bryant (composer) (born 1972), American composer and conductor
 Steven Matt Bryant (American football) (born 1975), American football player